Pseudonemesia parva is a species of spider in the family Microstigmatidae. It was described by Caporiacco (1955) in Venezuela.

References

Spiders of South America
Microstigmatidae
Spiders described in 1955